Mesosphaerum is a genus of flowering plants in the family Lamiaceae, native to the New World Tropics and Subtropics. Two species, Mesosphaerum pectinatum and Mesosphaerum suaveolens, have been introduced to the Old World, with M.suaveolens found in the tropics of Africa, Asia and Australia.

Species
Currently accepted species include:

Mesosphaerum argutifolium (Epling) Harley & J.F.B.Pastore
Mesosphaerum asperifolium (Standl.) Harley & J.F.B.Pastore
Mesosphaerum caatingense Harley & J.F.B.Pastore
Mesosphaerum chacapoyense (Briq.) Harley & J.F.B.Pastore
Mesosphaerum collinum (Brandegee) Harley & J.F.B.Pastore
Mesosphaerum diffusum (Epling) Harley & J.F.B.Pastore
Mesosphaerum diversifolium (Benth.) Kuntze
Mesosphaerum eriocephalum (Benth.) Kuntze
Mesosphaerum gymnocaulon (Epling) Harley & J.F.B.Pastore
Mesosphaerum irwinii (Harley) Harley & J.F.B.Pastore
Mesosphaerum lachnosphaerium (Epling) Harley & J.F.B.Pastore
Mesosphaerum marrubiifolium (Epling & Mathias) Harley & J.F.B.Pastore
Mesosphaerum melissoides (Kunth) Kuntze
Mesosphaerum oblongifolium (Benth.) Kuntze
Mesosphaerum obtusatum (Benth.) Kuntze
Mesosphaerum pectinatum (L.) Kuntze
Mesosphaerum perbullatum (Fern.Alonso) Harley & J.F.B.Pastore
Mesosphaerum pilosum (Benth.) Kuntze
Mesosphaerum pseudoglaucum (Epling) Harley & J.F.B.Pastore
Mesosphaerum purdiei (Benth.) Kuntze
Mesosphaerum septentrionale (Epling) Harley & J.F.B.Pastore
Mesosphaerum sidifolium (L'Hér.) Harley & J.F.B.Pastore
Mesosphaerum suaveolens (L.) Kuntze
Mesosphaerum urticoides (Kunth) Kuntze

References

Lamiaceae genera
Lamiaceae